Greatest Hits is the first compilation album by the American country music artist Earl Thomas Conley. It was released in September 1985 by RCA Records. The album peaked at number 1 on the Billboard Top Country Albums chart.

Track listing

Charts

Weekly charts

Year-end charts

References

1985 greatest hits albums
Earl Thomas Conley albums
RCA Records compilation albums